Kutty is a 2001 Tamil language film directed by Janaki Vishwanathan. The film's music is composed by Ilayaraja. Upon release, the film met with widespread critical acclaim.

Plot
The film revolves around a young girl who is forced into child labour working for an urban family after a tragedy in her own family. Paavaadai is a potter living in a village in the outskirts of Madurai. Even though his profession is in a miserable condition, he has high hopes for his daughter Kannammaa and raises her with much affection. Unfortunately, he dies in an accident and this forces Kannammaa to be sent to work for an urban family. The girl is quite happy about this, thinking about the prospects of good food and clothes. The family's working couple also treat her with kindness. However, the arrival of the mother-in-law changes everything. Kutty doesn't get enough food to eat and is mistreated by the old woman and her grandson. Day-by-day things get worsen. Once, Kutty's relatives come to see how she is doing. The grandmother behaves kindly to Kutty and makes them believe that she is completely happy there. Kutty too fails to communicate with them about her misery. Kutty watches the teenage girl who works in the opposite apartment being molested. And in a few days, she learns that the girl committed suicide. Even though supported by the couple (which infuriates the old woman), Kutty becomes desperate and decides to send a letter to her mother asking her to take her away back to the village. She tries to seek the help of a store owner, who is very kind to her. However, matters do not improve when Kutty reveals that she doesn't know the name of her village but she just knows the directions. One night, she decides to run away but she runs right into a man, who has a shop set up right next to Vivek's. He promises to help her and boards her onto a train. The man is then seen speaking to another man and bargaining for more money. The man says to Kutty that the other man will take good care of her and will reach her to her mother. But, the train is actually leaving not for her village, but to Mumbai, indicating that perhaps Kutty will be sold to a brothel. The film ends with showing Kutty's anticipated face on the prospect of going back to her mother.

Cast
 P. Shwetha as Kanamma (Kutty)
 Ramesh Arvind as Ranganathan
 Kausalya as Rohini
 Nassar as Pavadai
 Eashwari Rao as Chenthamarai
 M. N. Rajam as Ranganathan's mother
 Vivek as Owner of provision store
 R. S. Shivaji as Panwala
 S. N. Lakshmi as Viruthamba, Pavadai's mother
 Master Suraj as Vicky
 Ilavarasu as Pazhaniappan
 Kalairani as Valli

Production
The film was made in 20 days on a shoestring budget of ₹70 lakh (worth ₹5.5 crore in 2021 prices).

Awards
The film has won the following awards since its release:

2002 Cairo International Children's Film Festival (Egypt) 
 Won - Special International Jury Prize - Kutty - J.K. Vishwanathan

2002 National Film Awards (India) 
 Won - Silver Lotus Award - Best Child Artist - P. Shwetha
 Won - Silver Lotus Award - Special Jury Award - Director - J.K. Vishwanathan
2002 Gollapudi Srinivas Award
 Won - Best Debutant Director - J.K. Vishwanathan

References

External links
 

2001 films
2001 drama films
Films based on Indian novels
Films scored by Ilaiyaraaja
2000s Tamil-language films
Indian drama films